is a 2007 Japanese film directed by Daihachi Yoshida, based on the novel by Yukiko Motoya.

Awards
32nd Hochi Film Awards 
 Best Supporting Actress - Hiromi Nagasaku
29th Yokohama Film Festival
 Best Actress - Eriko Sato
 Best Supporting Actor - Masatoshi Nagase
 Best Supporting Actress - Hiromi Nagasaku
 Best New Director - Daihachi Yoshida
 Best Cinematography
 4th Best Film

References

2007 films
Films directed by Daihachi Yoshida
Films set in Ishikawa Prefecture
2000s Japanese films